Blood Heat is an original novel written by Jim Mortimore and based on the long-running British science fiction television series Doctor Who. It features the Seventh Doctor, Ace and Bernice. A prelude to the novel, also penned by Mortimore, appeared in Doctor Who Magazine #205. This novel is the first novel in the "Alternate Universe cycle" which continues until No Future.

Plot
A mysterious force breaks through the TARDIS exterior, throwing Bernice into the Vortex and forcing the Doctor to make an emergency landing.  At first thinking they've landed in prehistoric times (after a dinosaur knocks the TARDIS into a tar pit), the Doctor soon learns that they have landed on a parallel Earth.  On this Earth, the Silurians killed the Doctor in his third incarnation twenty years ago, then went on to kill most of humanity with a plague, and return Earth to its prehistoric state.  An embittered alternate version of the Brigadier, along with Liz Shaw and the remnants of UNIT, attempts to destroy the Silurians with nuclear missiles.  Ace manages to reactivate the Third Doctor's TARDIS (which had gone into hibernation after his death), which the Doctor then materializes around the entire Earth.  He then uses the Architectural Configuration controls to delete the inbound missiles and prevents the massacre of the Silurians.  The Doctor then manages to convince the Brigadier and the Silurian leader that the two races can and must live in peace.  The happy ending is ruined for Ace and Bernice, however, when the Doctor reveals that this alternate universe cannot survive without destroying the real Universe.  In order to save their Universe, the Doctor time rams his old TARDIS in order to start a chain reaction that will destroy the parallel universe after the current inhabitants have lived out the rest of their lives, vowing simultaneously to find whoever created this timeline and bring them to justice. When Ace and Bernice leave the Doctor alone, he pushes a lever, destroying the Alternate Earth automatically.

Continuity
The death of the Third Doctor takes place during the events of Doctor Who and the Silurians; his regeneration was somehow prevented by an unknown cause (later revealed in the New Adventure No Future to be the Meddling Monk).

The Seventh Doctor continues to pilot the Third Doctor's TARDIS until the New Adventure Happy Endings, when his TARDIS is returned to him by the Charrl (first seen in Birthright).

Ace meets an adult version of her childhood friend Manisha, first mentioned in the season 26 serial Ghost Light''.  In Ace's original timeline, Manisha died after her house was firebombed by skinheads.

External links
Blood Heat Prelude

Virgin New Adventures
1993 British novels
1993 science fiction novels
Novels by Jim Mortimore
Seventh Doctor novels
Fiction set in 1993
Novels about parallel universes